The Red Guards were American "Marxist–Leninist–Maoist collectives of community organizers and mass workers" originating in Los Angeles and Austin with other branches operating in Kansas City, Pittsburgh, and Charlotte, as well as St. Louis and San Marcos, under the distinct titles of Red Path Saint Louis and San Marcos Revolutionary Front respectively. 

The group is named after the Red Guards that operated under Mao Zedong in the People's Republic of China during the Cultural Revolution that were composed of militant students who campaigned against the "reactionary and bourgeois" culture of China. The Red Guards oppose left-wing organizations they deem revisionist, such as the Democratic Socialists of America (DSA), Party for Socialism and Liberation (PSL), and the Communist Party of the United States (CPUSA). As of 2022, all Red Guards chapters have either been abandoned or have announced their dissolution.

Several organizations speculated to be connected to former Red Guards include the Committee to Reconstitute the CPUSA, United Neighborhood Defense Movement, and the dormant Mike Ramos Brigade.

History 
The Red Guards in the United States first originated in the city of Austin, Texas, when in 2015, communists that were previously participating in an effort to form a communist party based around Marxist-Leninist-Maoist ideology split, and instead organized into a smaller grouping, known as the Austin Red Guards, whose activities were initially limited to charity and small demonstrations in favor of the LGBTQ+ community, which were commonly done under the slogan           "serve the people."

Later in 2015, the Red Guards went on an anti-electoral campaign, pushing for a boycott of the 2016 election, with the slogan, "Don't vote, revolt!"

On July 18, 2016, Red Guards Austin staged a show of solidarity with the Black Lives Matter movement. The Red Guards would later heavily critique the group's mode of operation as well as its leadership, declaring the movement to be forefronted by "pig apologists." 

After the election of President Donald Trump in November 2016, the Red Guards intensified their efforts, with Red Guards Austin stating "The war is not coming, it is here and now" in their "Everywhere is a Battlefield" polemic.

On September 21, 2017, a joint statement from Kansas City Revolutionary Collective (later known as Red Guards Kansas City), Red Guards Los Angeles, Tampa Maoist Collective, Queen City Maoist Collective (later known as Red Guards Charlotte), Red Guards Austin, and Revolutionary Association of Houston was released that heavily criticized and publicly severed all ties with the Saint Louis Revolutionary Collective due to alleged "horrendous security culture" and "weaponized identity politics" within Saint Louis Revolutionary Collective's leadership.

On March 8, 2018, the Kansas City Revolutionary Collective reconstituted itself as Red Guards Kansas City due to "a higher level of unity that has been achieved after almost two years of patient struggle with other Red Guards collectives, specifically Red Guards Austin" in regards primarily to questions of "the universality of protracted people’s war, party militarization, and concentric construction of the three instruments for revolution".

On December 17, 2018, Red Guards Austin dissolved after further controversy, with Red Guards Los Angeles following suit on May 17, 2019. In the subsequent months, most remaining Red Guards chapters ceased any official visible activity and announced their dissolution.

Ideology 
The Red Guards released an extensive description of their political philosophy in a position paper published online in 2016, titled "Condemned to Win!" In the article, it is explained that the theoretical structures of the collectives are based on the ideology of Marxism–Leninism–Maoism, with Maoism being principal. The Red Guards place a specific reverence for Abimael Guzmán, also known as "Chairman Gonzalo", who led the Shining Path revolutionary organization and waged a protracted people's war in Peru.

Canadian Maoist academic, J. Moufawad-Paul identifies this ideology as MLMpM, or "Maoism-Leninism-Marxism principally Maoism", a dogmatic subset of Maoism, which emerged from the Parti Communiste Francais (Marxism-Leninism-Maoism), a small French Maoist party that was established in 2011, and operated the website lesmaterialistes.com.

They have criticized other leftist groups including the Democratic Socialists of America, Party for Socialism and Liberation, and the Workers World Party.

Reception 
The Red Guards have been generally negatively received by most of the American political left. 

The Red Guards have been formally condemned by the Party for Socialism and Liberation (PSL). Following an alleged assault by the Red Guards in Austin, the PSL released a statement equating the Red Guard's provocations to tactics used by the FBI as part of COINTELPRO, which targeted left-wing dissidents in the 1960s and 1970s for suppression through the use of agent provocateurs.

Cosmonaut Magazine published an editorial by Konstantin Sverdlov condemning the group following a 2019 incident where members of the Red Guards Kansas City disrupted an event hosted by the local branch of the DSA, assaulted several members, and gave a public statement condemning the group as "social fascists". Sverdlov describes the group as being dogmatic and violent, routinely disrupting organizing activities, and being "fellow travelers of fascism".

See also 
Communist Party of Ecuador – Red Sun
Shining Path

References

External links 
 Red Guards Austin
 Red Guards Kansas City
 Red Guards Charlotte
 Tampa Maoist Collective

2015 establishments in the United States
Maoist organizations in the United States
Anti-capitalist organizations
Left-wing militant groups in the United States
Far-left politics in the United States
2018 disestablishments in the United States
Communism in the United States